Stefan Lundberg (born April 12, 1989, in Lower Burrell, Pennsylvania) is an American soccer player.

Career

College and Amateur
Lundberg attended Kiski Area High School where he was an NSCAA All-American, First Team Regional All-American, two-time All-State honoree, three-time All-WPIAL, and three-time All-Section selection during his three-year career there. Stefan was the Post-Gazette and Valley News Dispatch Player of the Year as well as Section Player of the Year. He broke school records in career goals and single season goals, still holding the single season record with 36 which led the whole WPIAL his senior year.

He went on to play four years of college soccer at Duquesne University, where he was named College Soccer News "Freshman to Keep and Eye On" and to the Atlantic 10 All-Rookie Team and the Atlantic 10 Pre-Season All-Rookie Team as a rookie in 2007, and to the Atlantic 10 All-Conference Second Team as a junior in 2008. As a senior, Lundberg was named to the Scholar All-America Team while nabbing First Team honors for both the All-Region and All-Conference teams, in addition to First Team Academic All-Region and All-Conference. He sits 6th in All-time career goals at Duquesne, as well as 7th in career points.

Professional
Lundberg turned professional in 2011 when he signed for the Pittsburgh Riverhounds of the USL Professional Division. He made his professional debut on May 21, 2011, in a game against F.C. New York, and scored his first professional goal on June 14 in a 3–2 win over Chattanooga FC in the Lamar Hunt US Open Cup.

References

External links
 Duquesne bio

1989 births
Living people
American soccer players
Duquesne Dukes men's soccer players
Pittsburgh Riverhounds SC players
USL Championship players
Association football midfielders